The Heralds of Harmony is a Tampa, Florida-based men's a cappella chorus that has been entertaining Florida audiences in the barbershop style continuously since 1945, and is currently ranked among the nation's best male vocal ensembles.      
The Tampa Bay Heralds of Harmony is a semi-professional chorus affiliated with the Barbershop Harmony Society (BHS).  The Heralds of Harmony are multiple-time Florida state barbershop chorus champions, and consistently represent the state at the BHS international chorus contest. 
The Heralds have ranked as high as 6th in the world.

It is one of the largest groups in the area and draws its members from several communities.

Several international qualifying quartets have emerged from the Heralds of Harmony, including BHS gold medal champions KEEPSAKE (1992) Keepsake (quartet) and PLATINUM (2000) Platinum (quartet).  Within the past several years, the chorus has been led by 3 different directors who are gold medal winners in chorus or quartet competition: Tony DeRosa, Randy Loos, and Roger Ross.  The Heralds have also performed with the Florida Orchestra on multiple occasions and have been directed by guest conductors Skitch Henderson and Doc Severinsen.

Throughout the year, the Heralds are featured as guest performers in various concert series and at numerous events throughout the Tampa Bay area as well as other parts of Florida. Their music has delighted a wide range of audiences in many different performance venues. In addition, the Heralds also annually produce their own shows at various times of the year, most notably their annual Christmas show.

The Heralds have regularly supported the community by providing benefit performances for the Spring of Tampa Bay (women's shelter) in Hillsborough County and The Hospice of the Florida Suncoast in Pinellas County.  The Heralds also engage in an active youth outreach program offering in-service training to many vocal music educators of Pinellas and Hillsborough Counties, providing numerous youth music scholarships, and by often participating as a clinic chorus in the Florida Music Educators Association Annual Convention.

The Arts Council of Hillsborough County announced that the Heralds of Harmony is a recipient of one of its 2011–12 Cultural Development Grants. They are listed as a valuable nonprofit arts and cultural resource to the State of Florida.

This is among the best barbershop choruses in the world, having won Florida district competitions seven times and placed as high as ninth in international competition.

International Competition 
The Heralds of Harmony were ranked 6th in the world at the Barbershop Harmony Society's International Competition in July 2018, at the Orange County Convention Center in Orlando, Florida.

Director
Tony DeRosa is a four-time gold medal-winning quartet champion (only the second man to achieve this feat) on the International stage. He won in 1992 with Keepsake (where De Rosa became the youngest gold medal winner at the age of 19), with Platinum in 2000, Max Q in 2007 and in 2017 with Main Street.

Tony currently sings lead with Main Street, a quartet dedicated to the traditional style of barbershop music.

Discography 

This Joint is Jumpin'   (CD; 1998)
Songs of Christmas      (CD; 2016)

References

External links 
Tampa Bay Heralds of Harmony

Barbershop music
American choirs
Barbershop Harmony Society choruses
Musical groups from Tampa, Florida
Musical groups established in 1945
1945 establishments in Florida
Men in Florida
Boys' and men's choirs